Jaber al-Ahmad International Stadium is a multi-purpose stadium in the Ardhiyah area of Kuwait City, Kuwait. Completed in 2009, it is used mostly for football matches and athletics. The stadium has a capacity of 60,000 seated spectators, the building is constructed in 4 levels, with 54 corporate boxes and parking lot with a 6,000 car capacity. It was expected to open in second quarter of 2010, but the building failed structural-integrity testing and remained closed due to a  miscalculation by structural engineers for nearly half a decade. However it was finally opened on 18 December 2015. Jaber Al-Ahmad stadium is currently the new home of the Kuwait national football team.

The stadium was named after late Amir of Kuwait Shaikh Jaber Al-Ahmad Al-Sabah. Kuwait celebrated their winning of Arabian Gulf Cup 20 in that stadium.

History

First match
Was an International Friendly between Kuwait National Team and Bahrain National Team ended 3-1 win to Bahrain.

Second match

AFC Cup 2010
The first ever official match held in the stadium was the 2010 AFC Cup Final between Qadsia SC and Al-Ittihad SC the match ended with a total of 59,783 total attendance and a scored of 1–1. The final score was 5–3 on penalties for the Syrian Team.

Renovations
In 2010 after the 2010 AFC Cup Final problems started to occur to the stadium which led to closing the stadium in 2011. Renovations started in 2014 and ended in 2015.

Re-opening
The Re-Opening was announced on 28 November 2015 for the 2015 Kuwait Champions Challenge where late Sabah Al-Ahmad Al-Jaber Al-Sabah came to the opening.
The match was between Kuwait XI and World Stars XI. The Kuwait XI won with a 4–2 score.
LET'S PLAY!, the multimedia opening show (Which was performed right before the match) was produced by Laser System Europe and Groupe F. It was written and directed by Rodolph Nasillski

The Kuwait FA at the time were banned by FIFA (Starting in October 2015) due to the Kuwaiti Government's interference of sports. With that, FIFA prevented Steven Gerrard, Andrea Pirlo (Who both were playing at the MLS), and Xavi (Who was playimg for Al Sadd SC at the Qatar Stars League) from playing in the match.

2015–16

Crown Prince Cup 

The Crown Prince Cup Final between Kuwait SC and Al-Salmiya SC was hosted there. The KFA was given 150,000 KD to host the final. The final show was right before the match, and it included prizes for the visitors, including phones, cars, computers. There was also a firework show before and after the match.

The match was played on Tuesday 12 January 2016. The referee was Ahmed Al-Ali.

The match ended a 1–0 win for Al-Salmiya SC over Kuwait SC in the final of 2015–16 Kuwait Crown Prince Cup and gave Al-Salmiya their 9th official Championship and the first ever team to win a championship in this stadium.

Emir's Cup

KFA decided to just host the final of the Kuwait Emir Cup.  It will be Al-Arabi SC against Kuwait SC The match was played on 5 April 2016 6:30 GMT+3, and ended 3-1 win for Kuwait SC. Kuwait SC won their 11th Emir Cup and the second team to win a domestic championship in the stadium.

2016–17

Super Cup 2016

KFA decided that Jaber International Stadium will host the Super Cup on 23 September after being delayed twice, and the dates were 21 September and 9 September. The Game will be the league champions Qadsia SC against the emir cup champions Kuwait SC. Kuwait won 3-2 on penalties after drawing 2-2 at full time.

2016-17 league matches

During the season a couple of match weeks were played on the stadium due to lack of stadiums available due to Burgan SC joining the league, while 2 other teams renovating their own respectful stadiums, one of these matches include the Kuwaiti Classico.

2016-17 Crown Prince Cup

Same as the league that season due to lack of available stadiums some matches will be played on this stadium.

Semi-finals

Final

2016–17 Emir Cup

2017–18

2017 Super Cup

2017–18 Kuwait Crown Prince Cup

Final

23rd Arabian Gulf Cup

the Arabian Gulf Cup returns to Kuwait after 3 years and after the Ban by FIFA has been lifted the AGCFF all decided to switch the host country to Kuwait. Oman were crowned Champions for the 2nd time after beating UAE on penalties in the final.

Group stage

Semi-finals

Final

National Team friendlies

2017-18 Emir Cup

Final

2018–19
With the start of Evolution and expansions in Kuwait organized by Kuwait Football Association this is the first time the football season starts this early in August.

2018–19 Crown prince Cup final

Statistics

Most appearances & wins

Club

Country

Goals

Number of goals scored in the stadium: 106
Scored in First Half: 44
Scored in Second Half: 62
Scored at Extra Time: 0

Records

Most team played in the stadium: Kuwait SC 10 times 
Highest scoring Match: 9 Goals Kazma SC 7-2 Al-Shabab SC 
Most team winning in the stadium: Kuwait SC 7 times 
Most team losing: Qadsia SC 3 times 
First goal in the stadium: Ismail Abdul-Latif 
First red card: Hussain Ali Baba

References 

Football venues in Kuwait
Athletics (track and field) venues in Kuwait
Multi-purpose stadiums in Kuwait